Terricula bifurcata is a species of moth of the family Tortricidae. It is found in Hunan, China.

References

	

Moths described in 2004
Archipini